Chickenfoot III is the second studio album by American hard rock band Chickenfoot, released on September 27, 2011. Despite the title, it is not actually the band's third album; other rumored titles that were mentioned include Chickenfoot IV (four). The first pressing of the album was packaged with a 3-D cover; it was later nominated for the Grammy Award for Best Recording Package at the 2012 ceremony.

Production
The band began to record the album back in April 2010, when they had some free time. They demoed four unnamed songs and put one of them in a video describing the A.M.P.F. technology (which stands for "Audio Musical Performance Fidelity").

On July 8, 2011, the band posted a new video online of the first teaser of one of the songs from the new album with this message included in the video: "Attention Foot Soldiers. Get Your Boots On. September 27, 2011."

Track listing

Vinyl release
Limited pressings in red vinyl and blue vinyl were also released in 12" LP format, but the hidden track "No Change" is not on the vinyl versions.

Bonus tracks

Personnel

Chickenfoot
Michael Anthony – bass guitar, backing vocals
Sammy Hagar – lead vocals, rhythm guitar
Joe Satriani – lead guitar, keyboards, piano
Chad Smith – drums, percussion

Additional personnel
 Joani Bye – background vocals (6)
 Linda Bye – background vocals (6)
 Monique Creber – background vocals (6)
 Mike Fraser – production, engineering, mixing
 Mike Keneally – piano, organ (2, 3, 6)

Chart performance

Weekly charts

Year-end charts

Sales

References

2011 albums
Albums produced by Mike Fraser
Chickenfoot albums
MNRK Music Group singles